Pizza Hut Israel is the Israeli franchise of Pizza Hut with 56 branches as of September 2014. Pizza Hut Israel is the largest pizza chain in Israel.

History
Pizza Hut Israel opened their first restaurant in 1990, under the master franchisee Clal Chains, a subsidiary of Clal Industries. Initially the chain opened many restaurants in Israel and was very successful 
It was in 1996, when Shlomo Duhoki through his company Penthouse paid the sum of US$12M and bought the business from Clal Chains.
In 2002 Pizza Hut Israel switch hands again, Dor Alon the Gas company takes over the business from Shlomo Duhoki.
in 2005 Udi Shamai becomes a partner with Dor Alon holding 30% of the business, after 3 years, in 2008 Udi buys the rest of the shares from Dor through a company controlled by him named Tabasco Holdings. By the time of this announcement Pizza Hut was down to 25 branches, from 33 branches in 2002. Some of the branches that remained were moved from large sit down locations to smaller delivery focused locations. At the time of the acquisition the chain was down to 20 branches. Tabasco although retaining ownership of some locations, also began franchising other locations in Israel.

During 2010, Niv Zilberstien joined Udi Shamai and became a Share holder in Tabasco Holdings.

In August 2013, Pizza Hut Israel released an Android and iPhone app to allow customers to track their order status in real time.

In 2013, Pizza Hut Israel reached 50 branches, and as of September 2014 there were 56 branches
Pizza Hut was operating 78 stores as of October 2016.

Kashrut
Pizza Hut Israel only carries kosher products. Most stores carry kashrut mehuderet, a higher level of kashrut.

Passover
A number of Pizza Hut Israel locations remain open during Passover. Due to the Chametz Law in Israel, no restaurant can serve any chametz product, including pizza, during Passover.

In 2014, 18 branches remained open during Passover.

Fare
Pizza Hut Israel offers a wide selection of food. Including the traditional deep dish, they also offer a thin crust pizza. In addition to pizza, they offer salads, quiche, focaccia, and various desserts.

West Bank franchises
Many fast food chains in the West Bank such as McDonald's have trouble getting franchises without going through the Israeli franchisee. Pizza Hut however did not feel this was needed and allowed the first Palestinian owned location to open in Ramallah in 2012.
Under the Israeli franchise agreement Pizza Hut has also allowed Israeli franchises to open in areas that are internationally recognised to be illegal settlements under international law,  leading to calls for a global boycott of the company.

Controversy
In May 2017, Pizza Hut Israel was embroiled in an international controversy as a result of Pizza Hut Israel's Twitter account posting a tweet mocking Palestinian prisoners on hunger strike. This led to further calls for a global boycott of the company, under the hashtag #boycott_pizzahut, additional to the calls already in place as a result of franchises operating in the West Bank.
In response, Pizza Hut apologized, and they deleted the tweet and fired the PR firm who created the ad.

In popular culture
In 2013, CEO and owner Udi Shamai appeared on the third episode of the first season of Undercover Boss Israel.

See also

 Culture of Israel
 Israeli cuisine
 Economy of Israel
 List of pizza chains
 List of restaurants in Israel

References 

Pizza Hut
Restaurant chains in Israel
1990 establishments in Israel